"Jocelyn Flores" is a song written and performed by American rapper and singer XXXTentacion. It is the second single from his debut studio album 17. The song is a homage to XXXTentacion's deceased friend of the same name as the song title. It was sent to rhythmic radio on October 31, 2017, as the album's second single.

Background

The song is dedicated to Jocelyn Amparo Flores, a 16-year-old native of The Bronx who later moved to Cleveland, Ohio. She flew to Florida to meet XXXTentacion and later committed suicide during the vacation on May 13, 2017. Flores' life and death have been subject to rumor and misinformation, which was addressed by a September 2018 article on The Daily Beast.

XXXTentacion became infatuated with Flores after seeing her photographs on Twitter and first communicated with her on May 1, 2017. He invited her to his state of Florida and hired her as a model for his Revenge clothing line and early reports mistakenly state that she was already a model and arrived in Florida purely for work, but she had not previously done such work. Another girl was also staying with the rapper, and while he was out to attend his cousin's prom, a bag containing $7,000 in cash was raided; each girl blamed the other. Concerned that the tension between the two guests would end in violence, XXXTentacion expelled both girls from his home and rescinded the offer for Flores to model for him; she checked into the Hampton Inn in Coconut Creek shortly before midnight and was found dead in the morning.

XXXTentacion also dedicated the song "Revenge" to Flores shortly after she died.

Flores' family members have had conflicting views on the use of her name as the song's title; some have felt touched and honored while others felt strongly offended by XXXTentacion not asking permission to use her name.

Composition
The song is built around a sample of producer Potsu's song "I'm Closing My Eyes", which includes vocals from Shiloh Dynasty.

Commercial performance
"Jocelyn Flores" entered at number 31 on the US Billboard Hot 100 and eventually peaked at number 19 after his death. It debuted at number 56 on the UK Singles Chart, selling 5,998 units including sales and streams. The song also entered at number 14 on the UK R&B Chart, and number two on the UK Independent Chart.

Personnel
XXXTentacion – primary artist, songwriter
Potsu – Producer 
JonFX – mixing engineer
Koen Heldens – mixing engineer

Charts

Weekly charts

Year-end charts

Certifications

Notes

References

External links

2017 singles
2017 songs
XXXTentacion songs
Empire Distribution singles
Songs written by XXXTentacion
Alternative hip hop songs
Emo songs